Uncle Ray’s is the brand name of a line of food products established by "Uncle" Ray Jenkins. All Uncle Ray's brand products are currently produced by Uncle Ray's LLC in Detroit, Michigan. Uncle Ray's LLC (formerly Cabana Foods) specializes in potato chips and other snack foods such as onion rings, pretzels, and cheese curls. Uncle Ray's potato chips are sold in 52 chain stores across every US state except for California and in Canadian Tire Gas Plus (Gas+) stations across Canada.

History
Ray Jenkins grew up in Detroit, Michigan in poverty. He dropped out of middle school at Grade 8 and took up a job in an iron foundry. He later joined the US Navy, becoming a cook on the USS Bristol. When he returned home, Jenkins decided to open up his own food business. 'Uncle Ray' Jenkins started his career in 1965 when he sold products out of the back seat of his Dodge Dart. This was a partnership with Robert Qualls. "We had $150, and we started with chip dip. We had a local dairy make the chip dip, and I sold it to taverns, to bowling allies, to little stores, out of the back seat of my car", recalls Jenkins.

In 1967, Ray bought 'Cabana,' a pork skins manufacturer, for $1,200 and began selling extruded corn and cheese products.  Still operating under the name 'Cabana', Ray purchased a  facility in Dearborn, Michigan in 1969. In 1983, he continued his expansion and bought the old Superior Potato Chip factory on the west side of Detroit.

Jenkins and Qualls became involved in a contentious legal battle which ended in the early 1990s, when the two men ended their partnership with Jenkins continuing on as the sole owner of the company. In 1993, pondering retirement, Jenkins sold the business to AmeriFoods. The company held Cabana Foods for only two years before selling it back to Jenkins, who changed the company name to Jenkins Foods and launched the 'Uncle Ray's' brand.  In April 2006, Ray sold the business to a large privately held company. The new company was established under the 'Uncle Ray's, LLC' name. 

Jenkins is a Christian. According to him, his belief in God was reinforced after he survived a two-week hospitalization following a hematemesis episode. A brief chapter from Jenkins' autobiography entitled "The Life and Times of Uncle Ray" can be found on the back of Uncle Ray's brand products. Each offers a moral lesson and includes a bible verse.

Uncle Ray's LLC is owned by The H. T. Hackney Company. Starting in 2016, Uncle Ray’s entered into a partnership with MiLB to be its official potato chip, with its products sold at over 70 minor league ballparks.

See also
 List of brand name snack foods

References

External links
 

Brand name snack foods
Products introduced in 1995